Kristján Eldjárn (6 December 1916 – 14 September 1982) was the third president of Iceland, from 1968 to 1980.

Biography
Kristján was born in Tjörn, Svarfaðardal, Iceland. His parents were Þórarinn Kr. Eldjárn, a teacher in Tjörn, and Sigrún Sigurhjartardóttir. He graduated in archaeology from the University of Copenhagen and taught at the University of Iceland. In 1957 he was awarded a doctorate for his research into pagan burials in Iceland. He was a teacher at the Akureyri Grammar School and the College of Navigation in Reykjavík, becoming a curator at the National Museum of Iceland in 1945 and its Director in 1947, a position he held until the 1968 presidential election.

In 1966–68 he hosted a series of educational TV programs on the (then new) Icelandic National Television (RÚV), in which he showed the audience some of the National Museum's artefacts and explained their historical context. These programs became quite popular, making him a well known and respected popular figure. This no doubt gave him the incentive needed to run in the 1968 presidential election as a politically non-affiliated candidate.

Starting as the underdog in the 1968 presidential election, running against Ambassador Gunnar Thoroddsen who initially had a 70% lead in the opinion polls, Kristján won 65.6% of the vote on a 92.2% voter turnout. He was re-elected unopposed in 1972 and 1976. In 1980 he decided not to run for another term, wanting to devote his remaining years entirely to continuing his lifelong academic work.

President Kristján Eldjárn died following heart surgery in Cleveland, Ohio on 13 September 1982.

His son Þórarinn Eldjárn is one of Iceland's most popular authors, specializing in short stories, but also writing poetry and an occasional novel. His daughter Sigrún Eldjárn is also an author and illustrator of several children's books. Þórarinn's son, Ari Eldjárn, is Iceland's most prominent stand-up comedian.

References

External link
Presidential biography and speeches

Kristjan Eldjarn
1916 births
1982 deaths
Kristjan Eldjarn
Kristjan Eldjarn
Kristjan Eldjarn
20th-century archaeologists